The Bougainville thicketbird (Cincloramphus llaneae) is a bird species. It had been placed in the "Old World warbler" family Sylviidae, but it does not seem to be a close relative of the typical warblers; probably it belongs in the grass warbler family Locustellidae. It is endemic to Bougainville Island. Its natural habitat is subtropical or tropical dry lowland grassland.  It used to be considered conspecific with the Santo thicketbird and the New Britain thicketbird.

References

Bougainville thicketbird
Birds of Bougainville Island
Bougainville thicketbird
Taxonomy articles created by Polbot
Taxobox binomials not recognized by IUCN